Stoop is a Dutch metonymic occupational surname. A stoop was a name for a jug or (wine) jar and a nickname for an innkeeper or wine merchant. People with this surname include:

 Adriaan Stoop (1856–1935), Dutch oil explorer
 Adrian Stoop (1883–1957), English rugby union player and administrator
 Andre Stoop, Namibian rugby footballer
 Dirk Stoop (ca.1618–1686), a painter of the Dutch Golden Age
 Georgie Stoop (born 1988), English tennis player
 Ineke Stoop (born 1953), Dutch statistician
 Julian de Stoop (born 1980), Australian journalist 
 Pieter Stoop (born 1946), Dutch abstract painter
 Rista Stoop (born 1970), South African female cricketer

See also
 Stoop (disambiguation)
 Stoops (disambiguation)

Dutch-language surnames